Unashamed may refer to:

 Unashamed (band), a Christian hardcore punk band
 Unashamed (album), a 2015 album by Building 429
 Unashamed (film), a 1932 American pre-Code film